This is a list of American television-related events in 1961.

Events

Other events in 1961 
The Sports Broadcasting Act was passed into law.

Television programs

Debuts

Changes of network affiliation

Ending this year

Network launches

Network closures

Television stations

Station launches

Network affiliation changes

Station closures

Births

Deaths

References

Sources

External links 
List of 1961 American television series at IMDb